Club Deportivo Cala d'Or is a Spanish football team based in Cala d'Or, Santanyí, in the autonomous community of Balearic Islands. Founded in 1982, it plays home matches at Estadio Municipal de Cala d'Or, with a capacity of 2,000 seats.

History
CD Cala d'or was founded in 1982, first reaching the fourth division in 1988, and going on to appear in a further five seasons in the category in the following 21 years.

Before the 2009–10 season started, the team withdrew from competition due to serious economic problems. After one year, it returned to official competition, in the third regional division, withdrawing again for 2012–13 season.

Season to season

6 seasons in Tercera División

References

External links
ffib.es profile 
Futbolme.com profile

Football clubs in the Balearic Islands
Sport in Mallorca
Association football clubs established in 1982
Santanyí
1982 establishments in Spain
Defunct football clubs in the Balearic Islands